WPXM-TV (channel 35) is a television station in Miami, Florida, United States, airing programming from the Ion Television network. It is owned and operated by the Ion Media subsidiary of the E. W. Scripps Company alongside CW affiliate WSFL-TV (channel 39), also licensed to Miami. WPXM-TV's offices are located on Northwest 14th Street in Sunrise, and its transmitter is located in Andover, Florida.

History
The station first signed on the air in October 1992 as WMLB-TV. Originally operating as an independent station, the station changed its call letters to WDLP-TV in January 1993, before changing it again to WCTD in December of that year. Channel 35 was acquired by Paxson Communications in 1997. Shortly after the sale was finalized, the station became an affiliate of the Infomall TV Network (inTV), which carried an infomercial format. On August 31, 1998, the station's call letters were changed to WPXM-TV; that same date, the station became a charter owned-and-operated station of Pax TV (now Ion).

From 2002 through the 2005 season, WPXM was the flagship broadcast station of the Florida Marlins (now the Miami Marlins), whose games also aired on then-sister station WPXP-TV in West Palm Beach.

Newscasts
From 2001 until 2005, when NBC entered a shared services agreement with Pax TV, WPXM aired rebroadcasts of NBC owned-and-operated station WTVJ (channel 6)'s newscasts.

Technical information

Subchannels
The station's digital signal is multiplexed:

Analog-to-digital conversion
WPXM-TV shut down its analog signal, on UHF channel 35, on February 17, 2009, the original target date in which full-power television stations in the United States to transition from analog to digital broadcasts under federal mandate (which was later pushed back to June 12, 2009). On February 18, the station's digital signal relocated from its pre-transition UHF channel 26 to channel 35. WPXM was the only Miami-licensed station that applied to cease analog transmissions on the original transition date, despite the DTV Delay Act having extended the deadline to June 12.

References

External links

PXM-TV
E. W. Scripps Company television stations
Ion Television affiliates
Bounce TV affiliates
Grit (TV network) affiliates
Laff (TV network) affiliates
Defy TV affiliates
Scripps News affiliates
Television channels and stations established in 1992
1992 establishments in Florida
Miami Gardens, Florida